The ZTR index is a method of determining how weathered, both chemically and mechanically, a sediment (or a corresponding sedimentary rock) is.  The letters in ZTR stand for 3 common minerals found in ultra-weathered sediments: zircon, tourmaline, and rutile.  Other minerals that can be used along the ZTR index are garnet, magnetite, sphene, and other minerals from local provenance sources.  The ZTR index is commonly high in beach or littoral zone depositional environments due to the long transport distances from the source and the high energy of the environment.  These minerals are found in abundance due to their high specific gravity and resistance to weathering.

References

 Hubert, John F., A zircon-tourmaline-rutile maturity index and the interdependence of the composition of heavy mineral assemblages with the gross composition and texture of sandstones, Journal of Sedimentary Research; September 1962; v. 32; no. 3; p. 440-450

Petrology
Sedimentology